Fist of the Warrior, formerly known as Lesser of Three Evils, is a martial arts/crime film directed by Wayne A. Kennedy in his feature film directorial debut. It stars Ho-Sung Pak, Peter Greene, Roger Guenveur Smith and Sherilyn Fenn, and features fight choreography by Ho-Sung Pak and Wayne A. Kennedy. The film was shot in 2004 in Los Angeles, California, USA, and was released by Lionsgate Home Entertainment on February 10, 2009.

Plot
The film follows three characters, a hit-man, a mobster and a corrupt detective who confront each other when events come to a head for them. Hit-man Lee Choe decides to retire to live a normal life. After refusing an order from mobster John Lowe, Lowe has Lee's girlfriend killed. In order to seek vengeance, Lee goes on a mission to kill Lowe, who turns to corrupt detective Craig Barnes to frame him. At the same time, Barnes, who's being investigated by internal affairs, has to deal with his unhappy, alcoholic wife Katie.

Cast
 Ho-Sung Pak as Lee Choe
 Peter Greene as John Lowe
 Roger Guenveur Smith as Det. Craig Barnes
 Robin Paul as Sarah Reeves
 Sherilyn Fenn as Katie Barnes
 Rosa Blasi as Woman in Black
 Antonio Fargas as Father Riley
 Ed Marinaro as Raymond Miles
 Michael Dorn as Arnold Denton
 John Dye as I.A. Officer
 A Martinez as Anthony Black
 Brian Thompson as Max
 Isaac C. Singleton Jr. as Frank
 Richard Gant as Chief Matthews
 Lara Phillips as Jenny Reeves
 Marina Sirtis as Mary
 Gina St. John as Det. Georgette Wilson

Production 
Principal photography took place in August 2004. Fist of the Warrior was produced by Ho-Sung Pak, Wayne A. Kennedy and Matthew Chausse who created together the film company GenOne. It was initially produced by CatchLight Films under the title Lesser of Three Evils and was originally to be distributed by Fabrication Films. The film was featured at the 2005 Cannes Film Market However it was not released and was the subject of a legal dispute that ended in January 2008. In 2008 the film was renamed as Blood Money with Boll World Sales owning the international distribution rights. After being re-edited by Aglet Post, the film was ultimately released in the US by Lionsgate on DVD in 2009 under the title Fist of the Warrior.

References

External links 
 Fist of the Warrior DVD program description (Doc) by Lionsgate
 Lesser of Three Evils at CatchLight Films

2009 films
2009 action films
American action films
American independent films
Lionsgate films
American martial arts films
2009 martial arts films
2009 directorial debut films
2000s English-language films
2000s American films